The athletics competition at the 2021 Islamic Solidarity Games was held in Konya, Turkey from 8 to 12 August 2022 in Konya Athletic Field. The Para Athletics competitions will be held in Konya Athletic Field on 11 August 2022. Countries can compete with a maximum of 2 athletes in each disability class (T46/T47 & T53/T54) in Para Athletics competitions. Men: High Jump T46/T47 Women: 100m T53/T54

The Games were originally scheduled to take place from 20 to 29 August 2021. In May 2020, the Islamic Solidarity Sports Federation (ISSF), who are responsible for the direction and control of the Islamic Solidarity Games, postponed the games as the 2020 Summer Olympics were postponed to July and August 2021, due to the global COVID-19 pandemic.

The competition was held at an altitude of over 1,000 metres which is said to increase performance in explosive events like sprinting and horizontal jumps.

All electronic time results during the first three days of competition have been cancelled because of wrong chronometre parameters but the order of medals still remains.

Medal table

Medalists

Men

Women

Mixed

Para athletics

Medal table

Men para athletics

Women para athletics

Participating nations

Athletics
468 athletes from 50 countries participated:

Para Athletics
21 athletes from 12 countries participated:

Gallery

External links 
Official website
Results – Men
Results – Women

References

2021
Islamic Solidarity Games
2021 Islamic Solidarity Games
2021 Islamic Solidarity Games